Frittelli is an Italian surname. Notable people with the surname include:

 Dylan Frittelli (born 1990), South African golfer
 Gino Frittelli (1879–1950), Italian painter
 Fabio Frittelli (1966–2013), Italian musician

Italian-language surnames